Giovanni Turba (25 September 1905 – 11 June 1994) was an Italian sprinter who competed at the 1932 Summer Olympics.

Olympic results

See also
 Italy national relay team

References

External links
 

1905 births
1994 deaths
Italian male sprinters
Athletes from Milan
Olympic athletes of Italy
Athletes (track and field) at the 1932 Summer Olympics